Coccas may refer to:

 Coccas, a deserter from the Eastern Roman Empire to the Ostrogoths in the Gothic War (535–554)
 Coccas, a type of ship